Dinarabad (also Romanized as Dīnārābād; also known as Dandarābād and Dindarābād) is a village in Sofalgaran Rural District, Lalejin District, Bahar County, Hamadan Province, Iran. At the 2006 census, its population was 2,142, in 491 families.

References 

Populated places in Bahar County